The Love Collection is a compilation album released digitally by singer Anna Vissi in February 2013 in Greece and Cyprus by Sony Music Greece

Track listing

References

Anna Vissi albums
2012 albums
Greek-language albums
Albums produced by Nikos Karvelas
Sony Music Greece compilation albums